Yam yam, along with Yam Yam and other variations, may refer to:

 a speaker of the Black Country dialect of the UK
Yamyam or Abdulkadir Hersi Siyad (1946-2005), Somali poet 
Yamyam Gucong (born 1993), Filipino actor and comedian 
Siu Yam-yam, Chinese actress
Yağmur Sarıgül, nicknamed "Yamyam", member of the Turkish band Manga
Yam Yam (album), 1995 album by the jazz musician Mark Turner